Russell Hotel may refer to:
 Hotel Russell, London hotel
 Russell Hotel (Ottawa), Ottawa hotel
 Russell Hotel, The Rocks, Sydney hotel
 The Russell Hotel, former Dublin hotel